Dimoerites may refer to either of two early Christian sects:

Apollinarism
Antidicomarism